The 2014 Arena Football League season was the 27th season in the history of the league. The regular season began on March 14, 2014 and ended on July 26, 2014.

League business

Teams
The city of Anaheim, California was awarded an expansion team on August 15, 2013. The team, named the Los Angeles Kiss, was the first AFL team to call Los Angeles home since the Los Angeles Avengers in 2008. Gene Simmons and Paul Stanley, members of the rock band Kiss, were the owners of the expansion franchise.

Two teams that competed in 2013 suspended operations, (Chicago Rush & Utah Blaze) and their rosters were dispersed throughout the league during a dispersal draft on September 6, 2013.

The Milwaukee Mustangs sold their league membership to Terry Emmert, who then started a new franchise in Portland, Oregon named the Portland Thunder.

Television
On December 17, 2013 it was announced that ESPN had agreed to a multi-year deal in televising several games, including the ArenaBowl. Additionally, at least 75 games during the season were to be aired on ESPN3, the network's online streaming service. ESPN had owned an equity interest in the former league organization prior to its bankruptcy, and had previously aired games as recently as the 2008 season, prior to the league's hiatus that resulted in the canceled 2009 season.

Realignment
With teams expanding, relocating and suspending operations, the AFL announced the divisional alignment for 2014 on October 29, 2013. The two conferences had an even number of teams, and were placed in two divisions.

Regular season standings

Eight teams qualify for the playoffs: four teams from each conference, of which two are division champions and the other two have the best records of the teams remaining.
 Green indicates clinched playoff berth
 Blue indicates division champion
 Gray indicates division champion and conference's best record

Tie-breakers
 San Antonio finished in second place in the West Division based on their greater point differential in head-to-head competition with Los Angeles.

Playoffs

Conference semifinals

Conference finals

ArenaBowl XXVII

All-Arena team

References